Wilmington station may refer to:

United States
Wilmington station (Delaware), officially the Joseph R. Biden Jr., Railroad Station, formerly known as Pennsylvania Station, as well as French Street Station
Water Street Station in Wilmington, Delaware
North Wilmington station, Massachusetts
Wilmington station (MBTA), Massachusetts
Imperial/Wilmington station, Los Angeles

United Kingdom
Wilmington railway station (England), Kingston upon Hull

See also
 Wilmington (disambiguation)